The 2018–19 Southern Lady Jaguars basketball team represented Southern University during the 2018–19 NCAA Division I women's basketball season. The Lady Jaguars, led by first year head coach Carlos Funchess, played their home games at the F. G. Clark Center, as members of the Southwestern Athletic Conference. They finished the season 20–13, 12–4 in SWAC play to win the SWAC regular season championship. They also won the SWAC women's tournament, earning them an automatic bid to the NCAA women's tournament. They were seeded sixteenth, and lost to No. 1 seed Mississippi State in the first round.

Roster

Schedule and results

|-
!colspan=9 style=| Non-conference regular season

|-
!colspan=9 style=| SWAC regular season

|-
!colspan=9 style=| SWAC Women's Tournament

|-
!colspan=9 style=| NCAA Women's Tournament

See also
2018–19 Southern Jaguars basketball team

References

Southern Lady Jaguars basketball seasons
Southern
Southern
Southern
Southern